Hirono Station is the name of multiple train stations in Japan.

 Hirono Station (Fukushima) in Fukushima Prefecture
 Hirono Station (Hyōgo) in Hyōgo Prefecture